The Corbeni (also: Sacalasău) is a right tributary of the river Valea Fânețelor in Romania. It flows into the Valea Fânețelor near Săliște.

References

Rivers of Romania
Rivers of Bihor County